Velloor (also known as Mevelloor) is a village in the Vaikom Taluk of the Kottayam district in Kerala, India.

Location
Regular bus services are available to the towns Vaikom, Piravom, Ernakulam and Kottayam. Velloor - Thonnalloor Cherukara Bridge has been inaugurated by Sri Oommen Chandy in 2014 and been connecting Velloor and Thonnalloor. Piravam Road railway station is situated in Velloor. Nearest towns are Piravom and Vaikom. The nearest airport is Cochin International Airport and which is just 1 h 42 min (53.3 km) away from Velloor.

Economy
The growth in Velloor achieved in the industrial sector during the past few years is considerable. Significant growth has occurred in the agriculture-based industrial sector, especially rubber-based industries, food products, engineering and other service sector industries.

Industries
There are four large and medium scale industries functioning in the panchayath. The only central public sector undertaking in the panchayat is the Hindustan Newsprint Limited, which is engaged in the production of newsprint. The main private sector company in the area is Cochin Cements Limited manufacturers of ACC Cements. These two companies provide employment to a large no of locals.

Demographics
The scenic beauty of velloor is that much mesmerizing to attract the tourists. Velloor is located in Kottayam District of Kerala.

Geography
Piravom Valiyapally (10 km), Vaikom Mahadeva Temple (14 km), and Kanjiramattom Mosque (10 km) are important shrines in the region. Keevelloor Sree Vamanaswamy temple is the famous temple located at this village. This is one among very few temples which is dedicated to loard Vamana an incarnation of Lord vishnu. The temple is huge and is currently under the management of travancore dewaswam board as per the order of the Hon. High court of Kerala as a result of litigation between managers . Hindustan Newsprint Limited is a major landmark here. Piravam Road railway station is the nearest railhead.

Educational institutions
Bhavans Newsprint Vidyalaya
K M H S Mevellor 
Govt: UPS Velloor
Rev.Fr.GMVHSS
CMSLPS Irumpayam

References

External links
About Velloor

Villages in Kottayam district